The Division of Housing and Community Renewal (DHCR) is an agency of the New York state government that oversees public and publicly-assisted housing. Within is the New York State Office of Rent Administration (ORA) which administers the rent regulation program for residential buildings constructed before 1947 in municipalities such as New York City.

References

Further reading
 State Housing Law, L. 1926, ch. 823
 L. 1927, ch. 35
 Public Housing Law, L. 1939, ch. 808
 Emergency Tenant Protection Act of 1974 (ETPA), chapter 576 of the Laws of 1974

External links
 New York State Homes and Community Renewal official website
 Division of Housing and Community Renewal in the New York Codes, Rules and Regulations (NYCRR)

State agencies of New York (state)